Greengrove is a locality of and town within the Central Coast region of New South Wales, Australia, near Mangrove Mountain and adjoining the Popran National Park about  west of Gosford. It is part of the  local government area.

Greengrove is a narrow north-to-south locality spread along the east bank of Mangrove Creek and is traversed by  Wisemans Ferry Road. Two district pioneers, Elizabeth Donovan (1791–1891) and Richard Woodbury (1811–1897) are honoured with parks bearing their name within the locality.

References

Suburbs of the Central Coast (New South Wales)